Apathetic EP is the fifth EP released by Relient K.  It was released on November 8, 2005, and was initially packaged with copies of Mmhmm, but is also available separately. The EP reached no. 94 on the Billboard 200. The song "In Like a Lion (Always Winter)" was originally intended to be included on the album Music Inspired by The Chronicles of Narnia: The Lion, the Witch, and the Wardrobe but was later excluded.

Track listing 

 "The Thief" went on to become "There was no Thief" on their 2008 EP, The Bird and the Bee Sides.

Credits 

 Matt Thiessen – lead vocals, guitar, piano, organ, bells
 Matt Hoopes – guitar, backing vocals
 Dave Douglas – drums, backing vocals
 John Warne – bass, backing vocals
 Jon Schneck – guitar, banjo, mandolin, backing vocals

Additional personnel
 Mark Lee Townsend – acoustic guitar and twelve string guitar on "In Like a Lion (Always Winter)"
 Davy Baysinger – additional vocals on "The Truth"
 Pete Prevost – additional vocals on "The Truth"
 Derek Kern – additional vocals on "The Truth"
 J.R. McNeely - audio mixing

References 

2005 EPs
Relient K EPs
Capitol Records EPs
Gotee Records EPs